Marc Mueller (born April 15, 1989) is the quarterbacks coach for the Calgary Stampeders of the Canadian Football League (CFL). He is a two-time Grey Cup champion as an assistant coach with the Stampeders. In college, he played quarterback for the Regina Rams of the CIS from 2007 to 2012.

Professional career
Mueller signed as an undrafted free agent with the Edmonton Eskimos of the CFL on May 9, 2011, following the 2011 CFL Draft. He was released on June 20, 2011, in order to play his final year for the Rams.

Coaching career
After completing his fifth and final year of CIS eligibility, Mueller joined the Regina Rams as the team's quarterbacks coach in 2013. The following year, he was named a defensive assistant coach for the Calgary Stampeders on February 18, 2014. In 2015, he became the Stampeders' running backs coach and was in that role for five years. He was named the quarterbacks coach for the Stampeders on January 16, 2020.

Personal life
Mueller is the grandson of former CFL quarterback and coach Ron Lancaster.

External links
Calgary Stampeders bio

References

1989 births
Living people
Canadian football quarterbacks
Edmonton Elks players
Sportspeople from Regina, Saskatchewan
Regina Rams players
Calgary Stampeders coaches